Donnette Ingrid Zacca (born May 2, 1957) is a Jamaican fine art photographer, lecturer, and artist. The Jamaican Magazine and the National Gallery of Jamaica have listed her among the best photographers in the nation. She has exhibited at the National Gallery's Biennial and was the recipient of the Institute of Jamaica's Silver Musgrave Medal in 2015.

Early life and education 
Zacca was born in St James, Jamaica. Zacca cites her having grown up in rural Jamaica as the beginning of her appreciation of the outdoors. One of her earliest exposures to photography was when her uncle had returned from the United States and gifted her a Kodak Instamatic camera when she around 13-14 years old. It was a small point and shoot camera with 24 exposures. Zacca attended Mt. Alvernia High School. She majored in graphic design and art education at the Edna Manley College of the Visual and Performing Arts. In 1988, Zacca received a USAID scholarship to study photography at the University of Ohio. Unfortunately, she experienced discrimination during her time there when another student had destroyed her artwork. In 2004, Zacca received her Masters of Fine Art degree from Maryland Institute College of Art.

Career
Zacca currently works as a photography lecturer and lab technician at Edna Manley College of the Visual and Performing Arts. She is the co-founder of the Jamaican photography club, Just Black and White (JBW). Zacca describes her art as the primary process of expressing her ideas. Zacca's approach to photography is based on the observation of her surroundings and the issues and concerns of women.

Personal life 
Zacca currently resides in Kingston, Jamaica.

Achievements 

 Commissioned by the Jamaica Postal Service to create 12 stamps in 2003.
 Received the Silver Musgrave Medal for outstanding merit.
 Received the Jamaica Cultural Development Annual Photography Award.
 Received the National Heritage Trust Photography Competition award.
 Received the National Gallery of Jamaica purchase award.

References

External links 
 Focal Point S01E04 Donnette Zacca interview on YouTube

1957 births
Living people
20th-century women artists
21st-century women artists
20th-century women photographers
21st-century women photographers
Jamaican photographers
Jamaican women photographers
Maryland Institute College of Art alumni
Ohio University alumni
People from Saint James Parish, Jamaica